Thomas, Tom or Tommy Davis may refer to:

Business
 Thomas E. Davis (1785–1878), British real estate developer in New York City
 Thomas Benjamin Frederick Davis (1867–1942), Jersey-born South African businessman
 Thomas Henry Davis (businessman) (1918–1999), founder of Piedmont Airlines
 Thomas J. Davis Jr. (1912–1989), American venture capitalist, founder of the Mayfield Fund
 Thomas Davis (shipwright) (?–?), English shipwright in Dutch service during the 18th century
 T. Cullen Davis (born 1933), American oil heir

Military
 Thomas Davis (Medal of Honor) (1837–1919), Welsh soldier who fought in the American Civil War
 Thomas Francis Davis (1853–1935), U.S. Army general
 Thomas A. Davis (1873–1964), American founder of two military schools
 Thomas Jefferson Davis (1893–1964), U.S. Army general

Politics

U.S.
 Thomas Terry Davis (died 1807), U.S. Representative from Kentucky
 Thomas Aspinwall Davis (1798–1845), American mayor of Boston in 1845
 Thomas Davis (Rhode Island politician) (1806–1895), Irish-American member of U.S. House of Representatives
 Thomas Treadwell Davis (1810–1872), U.S. Representative from New York
 Thomas Beall Davis (1828–1911), U.S. Representative from West Virginia
 Tom Davis (Virginia politician) (born 1949), U.S. Representative from Virginia
 Tom Davis (South Carolina politician) (born 1960), South Carolina State Senator for Beaufort County
 Thomas Davis (Wisconsin politician) (1817–1908), Wisconsin State Assemblyman for Walworth County

Other countries
 Thomas Davis (Young Irelander) (Thomas Osborne Davis, 1814–1845), Irish writer and politician
 Thomas Davis (Australian politician) (1856–1899), New South Wales politician
 Thomas Davis (Cook Islands politician) (1917–2007), Cook Island Prime Minister and former NASA researcher
 Thomas Clayton Davis (1889–1960), Canadian diplomat, politician and judge from Saskatchewan
 Thomas Osborne Davis (Canadian politician) (1856–1917), Canadian parliamentarian

Religion
 Thomas Davis (priest) (1804–1887), Church of England clergyman and hymn writer
 Thomas F. Davis (1804–1871), fifth bishop of the Episcopal Diocese of South Carolina
 Thomas Henry Davis (organist) (1867–1947), English priest and organist

Sports

American football
 Thomas Davis Sr. (born 1983), American football player
 Tommy Davis (kicker) (1934–1987), American football player, 49ers kicker
 Tommy Davis (defensive end) (born 1982), American football player

Olympics
 Tom Davis (handcyclist) (born 1977), American Paralympian, 2016 Rio Paralympics

Other sports
 Tom Davis (basketball coach) (born 1938), American college basketball coach
 Tom Davis (basketball player) (born c. 1970), American college basketball player
 Tommy Davis (catcher) (born 1973), American baseball catcher
 Tommy Davis (outfielder) (1939–2022), American baseball outfielder
 Thomas Davis (cricketer) (1827–1898), English cricketer
 Thomas Davis GAA, a Gaelic football club in Tallaght, County Dublin, Ireland
 Thomas Davis GFC, Corrinshego, a Gaelic football club in Corrinshego in County Armagh, Northern Ireland
 Tom Davis (footballer, born 1901) (1901–?), English association footballer
 Tom Davis (footballer, born 1911) (1911–1987), Irish association footballer
 Tom Davis (rugby union) (c. 1894–?), rugby union player who represented Australia

Other uses
 Thomas Davis (chief) (1755–1837), Mohawk Chief of Davisville/Davis' Hamlet, near Brantford, Ontario
 Thomas Hoyt Davis (1892–1969), U.S. federal judge
 Tom Davis (comedian) (1952–2012), American comedy writer on Saturday Night Live
 Tom Davis (journalist) (born 1967), mental-health educator
 Tom Davis (British actor) (born 1979), comedian and actor
 Tommy Davis (Scientology) (born 1972), former spokesperson for the Church of Scientology

See also
 Thomas Davies (disambiguation)
 Thomas Henry Davis (disambiguation)
 Thomas Osborne Davis (disambiguation)
 Thomas Davis House (disambiguation), several houses in the United States